Pandorea floribunda is a species of flowering plant in the family Bignoniaceae and is endemic to eastern Australia.

This species was first formally described in 1845 by Augustin Pyramus de Candolle who gave it the name Tecoma floribunda in his treatise, Prodromus Systematis Naturalis Regni Vegetabilis from an unpublished description by Allan Cunningham. In 2008, Gordon P. Guymer changed the name to Pandorea floribunda in the journal Austrobaileya.

References

floribunda
Lamiales of Australia
Flora of New South Wales
Flora of Queensland
Taxa named by Augustin Pyramus de Candolle
Plants described in 1845